The Writer's Journey: Mythic Structure For Writers is a popular screenwriting textbook by writer Christopher Vogler, focusing on the theory that most stories can be boiled down to a series of narrative structures and character archetypes, described through mythological allegory.

The book was very well received upon its release, and is often featured in recommended reading lists for student screenwriters.

History
The book stems from a seven-page studio memo, "A Practical Guide to The Hero with a Thousand Faces".

An earlier edition, The Writer's Journey: Mythic Structure for Storytellers and Screenwriters, was published in 1992. Vogler revised the book for the second release in 1998 and changed the title to The Writer's Journey: Mythic Structure for Writers. The third edition, published in 2007, included a new introduction, new artwork, and analysis of recent, popular motion pictures. In July 2020, the 25th Anniversary Edition will be published, which, according to the new edition's back cover, will include new sections and topics.

Summary of content

The archetypes
The first part of the book describes eight major character archetypes in detail. Those are:
Hero: someone who is willing to sacrifice his own needs on behalf of others
Mentor: all the characters who teach and protect heroes and give them gifts
Threshold Guardian: a menacing face to the hero, but if understood, they can be overcome
Herald: a force that brings a new challenge to the hero
Shapeshifter: characters who change constantly from the hero's point of view
Shadow: character who represents the energy of the dark side
Ally: someone who travels with the hero through the journey, serving  variety of functions
Trickster: embodies the energies of mischief and desire for change

Stages of the Journey
The second part describes the twelve stages of the Hero's Journey. The stages are:
The Ordinary World: the hero is seen in their everyday life
The Call to Adventure: the initiating incident of the story
Refusal of the Call: the hero experiences some hesitation to answer the call
Meeting with the Mentor: the hero gains the supplies, knowledge, and confidence needed to commence the adventure
Crossing the First Threshold: the hero commits wholeheartedly to the adventure
Tests, Allies, and Enemies: the hero explores the special world, faces trial, and makes friends and enemies
Approach to the Innermost Cave: the hero nears the center of the story and the special world
The Ordeal: the hero faces the greatest challenge yet and experiences death and rebirth
Reward: the hero experiences the consequences of surviving death
The Road Back: the hero returns to the ordinary world or continues to an ultimate destination
The Resurrection: the hero experiences a final moment of death and rebirth so they are pure when they reenter the ordinary world
Return with the Elixir: the hero returns with something to improve the ordinary world

See also
 Dan Harmon, eight-step Story Circle
 John Yorke, author of Into The Woods: A Five-Act Journey Into Story, another book about the parallels between myths and screenwriting
 Three-act structure

References

External links
 

1998 non-fiction books
books about writing
comparative mythology
handbooks and manuals about screenwriting